Olga Anhalzer Fisch (1901-December 30, 1990) was a Bauhaus artist, rug maker, art collector, and gallery owner. Her work is in the collection of the United Nations and has been exhibited at the Museum of Modern Art, Lincoln Center, and The Textile Museum.

Her collection of Ecuadorian art and artifacts was featured in the Renwick Gallery's 1981 exhibition, A Feast of Color: Corpus Christi Dance Costumes of Ecuador.

Fisch, who was Jewish, fled Hungary due to Nazi persecution. She and her husband, Bela, settled in Ecuador in 1939 and opened the gallery, Olga Fisch Folklore, in 1942.

Early life 
Fisch was born in Budapest, Hungary in 1901 and lived in the town of Győr, Hungary.

As a child, she collected folk art from Hungarian villages.

Fisch was Jewish.

Career 

Fisch worked painting ceramics in Vienna, Austria and went on to study painting in Dusseldorf, Germany where she met her first husband, Jupp Rubsam. The couple later divorced.

Fisch and her second husband, Bela, fled Hungary due to Nazi persecution. In 1939, they settled in Quito, Ecuador where Fisch taught at the Quito School of Art.

Fisch became interested in Ecuadorian culture and began collecting folk art created by Indigenous Ecuadorian artisans.

She designed rugs inspired by Ecuadorian culture. The rugs were produced by local weavers.

Three months after The Fisches arrived in Quito, they were visited by Lincoln Kirstein of the Museum of Modern Art in New York. Kirstein purchased a rug from Fisch for $300. The couple used the money to open their gallery, Olga Fisch Folklore, where they sold Fisch's works as well folk art and other pieces produced by local artisans.

Fisch compensated the craftspeople who worked for her, as well as the artisans whose worked she sold, with a living wage.

As of 2023, Olga Fisch Folklore, also known as simply Olga Fisch or Folklore is still in operation.

Death 
Fisch died in Ecuador on December 30, 1990.

Collections 
United Nations, Handwoven Ecuadorean Rugs, Acquired February 20, 1956

References 

Hungarian artists
Hungarian women artists
1901 births
1990 deaths
Jewish women artists